Homoousion (from , , "same" and , , "being" or "essence") is a Christian theological term, most notably used in the Nicene Creed for describing Jesus (God the Son) as "same in being" or "same in essence" with God the Father. The same term was later also applied to the Holy Spirit in order to designate him as being "same in essence" with the Father and the Son. Those notions became cornerstones of theology in Nicene Christianity, and also represent one of the most important theological concepts within the Trinitarian doctrinal understanding of God.

Terminology
From its Greek original, the term was translated into other languages. In Latin, which is lacking a present participle of the verb 'to be', two main corresponding variants occurred. Some modern scholars say that  is properly translated as coessential, while consubstantial has a much wider spectrum of meanings. The Book of Common Prayer renders the term as "being of one substance with the Father."

From  (coessential), the theological term  (coessentiality) was also derived. It was used by Greek-speaking authors, like Didymus of Alexandria and other theologians.

Pre-Nicene usage
The term  had been used before its adoption by the First Council of Nicaea. The Gnostics were the first to use the word , while before the Gnostics there is no trace at all of its existence. The early church theologians were probably made aware of this concept, and thus of the doctrine of emanation, taught by the Gnostics. In Gnostic texts, the word  is used with the following meanings:
 Identity of substance between generator and generated.
 Identity of substance between things generated of the same substance.
 Identity of substance between the partners of a syzygy. 
For example, Basilides, the first known Gnostic thinker to use  in the first half of the 2nd century AD, speaks of a threefold sonship consubstantial with the god who is not. The Valentinian Gnostic Ptolemy says in his letter to Flora that it is the nature of the good God to beget and bring forth only beings similar to, and consubstantial with, himself. The term  was already in current use by the 2nd-century Gnostics, and through their works it became known to the orthodox heresiologists, though this Gnostic use of the term had no reference to the specific relationship between Father and Son, as is the case in the Nicene Creed.

Adoption in the Nicene Creed
The Nicene Creed is the official doctrine of most Christian churches—the Catholic Church, Eastern Orthodox Church, Oriental Orthodox Churches, Church of the East, and Anglican Communion, as well as Lutheran, Reformed, Evangelical, and most mainline Protestant churches—with regard to the ontological status of the three persons or hypostases of the Trinity: Father, Son, and Holy Spirit.

Origen seems to have been the first ecclesiastical writer to use the word  in a nontrinitarian context, but it is evident in his writings that he considered the Son's divinity lesser than the Father's, since he even calls the Son "a creature". It was by Athanasius of Alexandria and the Nicene Council that the Son was taken to have exactly the same essence with the Father, and in the Nicene Creed the Son was declared to be as immutable as his Father.

While it is common to find statements that Origen and other early apologist Church fathers held subordinationist views, Ilaria Ramelli discussed the "anti-subordinationism" of Origen.

Both the Nicene and Athanasian creeds affirm the Son as both begotten of, and equal to his Father. If so, many concepts of the Holy Trinity would appear to have already existed relatively early while the specific language used to affirm the doctrine continued to develop.

According to this doctrine, Jesus Christ is the physical manifestation of Logos (or the Word), and consequently possesses all of the inherent, ineffable perfections which religion and philosophy attribute to the Supreme Being. In the language that became universally accepted after the First Council of Constantinople in AD 381, three distinct and infinite hypostases, or divine persons, the Father, the Son, and the Holy Spirit, fully possess the very same divine .

This doctrine was formulated in the 4th century, during the Arian controversy over Christology between Arius and Athanasius. The several distinct branches of Arianism which sometimes conflicted with each other as well as with the pro-Nicene homoousian creed can be roughly broken down into the following classifications:
Homoeanism (also from ), which declared that the Son was similar to God the Father, without reference to substance or essence. Some supporters of Homoean formulae also supported one of the other descriptions. Other Homoeans declared that the father was so incomparable and ineffably transcendent that even the ideas of likeness, similarity or identity in substance or essence with the subordinate Son and Holy Spirit were heretical and not justified by the Gospels.
Heteroousianism (including Anomoeanism), which held that God the Father and the Son were different in substance and/or attributes.

The struggle over the understanding of Christ's divinity was not solely a matter for the Church. The Roman Emperor Theodosius had published an edict, prior to the Council of Constantinople, declaring that the Nicene Creed was the legitimate doctrine and that those opposed to it were heretics.

It has also been said that the term , which Athanasius favored and which was ratified in the Nicene Council and Creed, was actually a term reported to also be used and favored by the Sabellians in their Christology. It was a term with which many followers of Athanasius were actually uncomfortable. The so-called Semi-Arians in particular objected to it. Their objection to this term was that it was considered to be "un-Scriptural, suspicious, and of a Sabellian tendency." This was because Sabellius also considered the Father and the Son to be "one substance", meaning that, to Sabellius, the Father and the Son were "one essential Person", though operating in different faces, roles, or modes. This notion, however, was also rejected at the Council of Nicaea, in favor of the Athanasian Creed, which holds the Father and Son to be distinct yet also coequal, coeternal, and consubstantial divine persons.

See also
Consubstantiality

Notes

References

Bibliography

Further reading
 .
 .

Trinitarianism
Christian terminology
Nature of Jesus Christ